The Kom al-Ahmar Necropolis is a necropolis in the southern area of Nekhen, Egypt. Its discovery, by a joint US–Egyptian team, was announced on April 21, 2005.  The complex dates to the Amratian culture around 3600 BC.

References

4th-millennium BC establishments
2005 archaeological discoveries
Tombs of ancient Egypt
Amratian culture